The 1979 European Karate Championships, the 14th edition, was held  in Helsinki, Finland from May 4 to 6, 1979.

Competition

Team

References

1979
International sports competitions hosted by Finland
European Karate Championships
European championships in 1978
International sports competitions in Helsinki
1970s in Helsinki
Karate competitions in Finland
May 1979 sports events in Europe